The men's 10 kilometre classical at the 2017 Asian Winter Games was held on 20 February 2017 at the Shirahatayama Open Stadium in Sapporo, Japan.

Schedule
All times are Japan Standard Time (UTC+09:00)

Results

References

External links
Results at FIS website

Men 10